BDZ (an abbreviation for "bulldozer") is the debut Japanese studio album (second overall) by South Korean girl group Twice. It was released on September 12, 2018, by Warner Music Japan. The album contains five previously released songs and five new ones, including the title track of the same name produced by Park Jin-young. The title "symbolizes the members' wish to be tough and live strong".

A repackaged edition with one additional song was released on December 26, 2018.

Background and release
On June 3, 2018, at Twice 2nd Tour: Twiceland Zone 2 – Fantasy Park in Osaka, it was announced that Twice would release their first Japanese album in the autumn. The title track "BDZ" was pre-released as a digital single on August 17, along with the accompanying music video. The full album was released on September 12, along with a "document video" of "Be as One" featuring behind-the-scenes footage of Twice's first year in Japan.

A repackage was released on December 26, 2018, containing "Stay by My Side", the theme song of the Japanese television drama . "Stay by My Side" was released as a digital single on October 22 along with a "making" music video showing Twice recording the song.

Promotion
"BDZ" was first performed on Music Station on August 31, 2018, and it was performed on the opening stage of Tokyo Girls Collection the next day. All songs from the album were performed during Twice 1st Arena Tour 2018 "BDZ", which began on September 29 in Chiba.

Commercial performance
BDZ debuted at number 1 on the daily ranking of Oricon Albums Chart with 89,721 units sold, setting a record for the highest first day sales of albums released by K-pop girl groups in Japan. It also topped the weekly ranking with 181,069 units sold, making Twice the fifth foreign female artist in Oricon history to top both the weekly singles and albums chart, after The Nolans, BoA, Kara, and Girls' Generation. On Oricon Digital Album Chart, it debuted at number 1 with 3,103 download count.

The album topped the Billboard Japan, sold 181,605 copies and 3,239 downloads from September 10–16, 2018. On September 15, it was reported that it sold more than 292,300 copies in pre-orders. It was certified Platinum by the RIAJ on October 11 – Twice's fifth consecutive platinum certification.

Track listing

Personnel
Credits adapted from CD album liner notes.

JYP Entertainment staff

 Song Ji-eun "Shannen" (JYP Entertainment Japan) – executive producer
 Jimmy Jeong (JYP Entertainment) – executive producer
 Cho Hae-sung (JYP Entertainment) – executive producer
 J. Y. Park "The Asiansoul" – producer
 Min Lee "collapsedone" – assistant producer
 Kim Seung-soo – assistant producer
 Park Nam-yong (JYP Entertainment) – performance director
 Kim Hyung-woong (JYP Entertainment) – performance director
 Yun Hee-so (JYP Entertainment) – performance director
 Na Tae-hoon (JYP Entertainment) – performance director
 Yoo Kwang-yeol (JYP Entertainment) – performance director
 Kang Da-sol (JYP Entertainment) – performance director
 Park Gyeong-seok (JYP Entertainment) – performance director
 Sim Kyu-jin (JYP Entertainment) – performance director
 Bock Mi-ran (JYP Entertainment) – performance director
 Lee Tae-sub (JYP Entertainment) – recording engineer
 Choi Hye-jin (JYP Entertainment) – recording engineer
 Eom Se-hee (JYP Entertainment) – recording engineer
 Lim Hong-jin (JYP Entertainment) – recording engineer
 Jang Han-soo (JYP Entertainment) – recording engineer
 No Min-ji (JYP Entertainment) – recording engineer
 Lee Sang-yeop (JYP Entertainment) – recording engineer

Japanese recording staff

 Goei Ito (Obelisk) – music director
 Yu-ki Kokubo (Obelisk) – recording director
 Satoshi Sasamoto – Pro Tools operation
 Manubu Ohta – Pro Tools operation

Design staff

 Toshiyuki Suzuki (United Lounge Tokyo) – art direction
 Yasuhiro Ueda (United Lounge Tokyo) – design
 Tommy – photography
 Choi Hee-sun (F. Choi) - style director
 Seo Ji-eun (F. Choi) - style director
 Lee Ga-young (F. Choi) - style director
 Lee Jin-young (F. Choi) - assistant stylist
 Noh Hee-ha (F. Choi) - assistant stylist
 Jung Nan-young (Lulu Hair Makeup Studio) – hair director
 Choi Ji-young (Lulu Hair Makeup Studio) – hair director
 Son Eun-hee (Lulu Hair Makeup Studio) – hair director
 Jo Sang-ki (Lulu Hair Makeup Studio) – makeup director
 Jeon Dallae (Lulu Hair Makeup Studio) – makeup director
 Zia (Lulu Hair Makeup Studio) – makeup director
 Won Jung-yo (Bit&Boot) – makeup director
 Choi Su-ji (Bit&Boot) – assistant makeup director
 Naoyuki Hashimoto (Magenta Wall Design Inc. Tokyo) – production designer
 Yuzo Morota – production manager

Other personnel

 J. Y. Park "The Asiansoul" – all instruments (on "BDZ")
 Hae Sol Lee – all instruments and computer programming (on "BDZ")
 Jaepil Jung – guitars (on "BDZ" and "One More Time")
 Twice – background vocals
 Ikuko Tsutsumi – background vocals
 Dr. Jo – vocal recording director (on "BDZ")
 Tony Maserati – mixing engineer (on "BDZ", "One More Time", "Candy Pop", "Wake Me Up")
 Chris Gehringer – mastering engineer
 Na.Zu.Na – all instruments (on "BDZ", "One More Time", "L.O.V.E", "Brand New Girl")
 Min Lee "collapsedone" – all instruments and computer programming (on "Candy Pop" and "Say it Again")
 Mayu Wakisaka – background vocals and vocal recording director (on "Candy Pop" and "Say it Again")
 Naoki Yamada – mixing engineer (on "L.O.V.E", "Wishing", "Brand New Girl", "I Want You Back")
 Mussashi (Albi Albertsson) – all instruments (on "Wishing")
 Brian – recording engineer (on "Wishing")
 Shin Bong-won – mixing engineer (on "Say it Again")
 Atsushi Shimada – all instruments (on "Wake Me Up")
 Kim Seung-soo – all instruments (on "Be as One")
 Choi Hyun-jun – all instruments and vocal recording director (on "Be as One")
 Chung Soo-wan – guitars (on "Be as One")
 Jo Jun-sung – mixing engineer (on "Be as One")
 Yuichi Ohno – all instruments except guitars (on "I Want You Back")
 Akitoshi Kuroda – guitars (on "I Want You Back")

Locations
Recording
 JYPE Studios, Seoul, South Korea (all songs except "Wishing")
 U Production Studio, Seoul, South Korea ("Wishing")

Mixing
 Mirrorball Studios, North Hollywood, California ("BDZ", "One More Time", "Candy Pop", "Wake Me Up")
 I to I Communications, Tokyo, Japan ("L.O.V.E", "Wishing", "Brand New Girl", "I Want You Back")
 MusicLab Busan Studios, Busan, South Korea ("Say it Again")
 WSound, Seoul, South Korea ("Be as One")

Mastering
 Sterling Sound, New York City, New York

Charts

Weekly charts

Year-end charts

Certifications

Accolades

References

2018 albums
Twice (group) albums
Warner Music Japan albums
Japanese-language albums
Electropop albums